Lazy bed ( or) is a traditional method of arable cultivation. It was used in southern parts of Britain from the post-Roman period until the post-medieval period, and across much of Ireland and Scotland until the 19th century.

Although it is largely extinct, it is still to be found in parts of the Hebrides and the west of Ireland. In these places, the method used is normally to lift up sods of peat and apply desalinated seaweed fertiliser to improve the ground. Potatoes were often grown in this way in these regions, until the potato blight Phytophthora infestans caused potato famine in the Highlands and Ireland.

See also
 Run rig
 Foot plough

External links

Lazy beds in County Antrim, N.Ireland
Lazy beds in Sperrin Mountains, County Londonderry, N.Ireland

History of agriculture in Scotland
Agriculture in Scotland
Agriculture in Ireland
History of agriculture in Ireland
Outer Hebrides